The 1967 European Women's Artistic Gymnastics Championships were held in Amsterdam from May 25–27, 1967.

Medalists

Results

All-around

Vault

Uneven bars

Balance beam

Floor

References 

1967
International gymnastics competitions hosted by the Netherlands
1967 in Dutch women's sport
Euro